The 1936 Ohio Bobcats football team was an American football team that represented Ohio University as a member of the Buckeye Athletic Association (BAA) during the 1936 college football season. In their 13th season under head coach Don Peden, the Bobcats compiled a 5–2–1 record (3–1–1 against conference opponents), tied for the conference championship, and outscored opponents by a total of 102 to 70.

Schedule

References

Ohio
Ohio Bobcats football seasons
Ohio Bobcats football